Federal Route 276, comprising Jalan Baru Changlun and Jalan Lama Changlun, is a federal road in Kedah, Malaysia. The Kilometre Zero is located at Changlun.

Features
At most sections, the Federal Route 276 was built under the JKR R5 road standard, with a speed limit of 90 km/h.

List of interchanges, junctions and towns

Jalan Baru Changlun (new roads)

Jalan Lama Changlun (old roads)

References

276